"Any Time" is a Tin Pan Alley song written by Herbert "Happy" Lawson. The song was published in 1921 and first recorded by Emmett Miller for OKeh Records in 1924. Accompanying himself on ukulele, Lawson recorded his own version for Gennett Records on July 31, 1925. It became associated with Country music when Eddy Arnold rescued it from obscurity in 1948, topping the Billboard Juke Box Folk Records Chart for nine weeks.

Charted versions
Eddy Arnold released a version in 1948 that reached #1 on the U.S. country chart and #17 on the U.S. pop chart.
Foy Willing and His Riders of the Purple Sage released a version in 1948 that reached #13 on the U.S. country chart.
Eddie Fisher released a version in 1951 that reached #2 in the U.S.
Helen O'Connell released a version on Capitol in 1952 
Patsy Cline recorded a version that was released posthumously in 1969 and reached #73 on the U.S. country chart.
The Osmond Brothers released a version that reached #54 on the U.S. country chart in 1985.

References

1921 songs
1925 singles
1928 singles
1948 singles
1951 singles
1969 singles
1985 singles
Eddy Arnold songs
Eddie Fisher (singer) songs
Patsy Cline songs
The Osmonds songs
Pat Boone songs
Okeh Records singles